Anass Salah-Eddine (born 18 January 2002) is a Dutch professional footballer who plays as a defender for Eredivisie club Twente, on loan from Ajax.

Club career 
Salah-Eddine youth career started with Jong Ajax in 2018. On 1 August 2022, he signed a contract extension until the end of the 2025 season. He then joined FC Twente on loan for the 2022–23 season.

International career
Born in the Netherlands, Salah-Eddine is of Moroccan descent. He is a youth international for the Netherlands.

Career statistics

Honours
Netherlands U17
UEFA European Under-17 Championship: 2019

References

2002 births
Living people
Dutch footballers
Netherlands youth international footballers
Association football defenders
Blauw-Wit Amsterdam players
Amsterdamsche FC players
AZ Alkmaar players
AFC Ajax players
Jong Ajax players
FC Twente players
Eerste Divisie players
Dutch sportspeople of Moroccan descent